This is a list of fictional towns and villages in comics.

References

Towns
Lists of fictional populated places
Fictional locations in comics